Jacobi symbol  for various k (along top) and n (along left side). Only  are shown, since due to rule (2) below any other k can be reduced modulo n. Notice also that when either n or k is a square, all values are nonnegative.
The Jacobi symbol is a generalization of the Legendre symbol. Introduced by Jacobi in 1837, it is of theoretical interest in modular arithmetic and other branches of number theory, but its main use is in computational number theory, especially primality testing and integer factorization; these in turn are important in cryptography.

Definition
For any integer a and any positive odd integer n, the Jacobi symbol  is defined as the product of the Legendre symbols corresponding to the prime factors of n:

where

is the prime factorization of n.

The Legendre symbol  is defined for all integers a and all odd primes p by

Following the normal convention for the empty product,  = 1.

When the lower argument is an odd prime, the Jacobi symbol is equal to the Legendre symbol.

Table of values

The following is a table of values of Jacobi symbol  with n ≤ 59, k ≤ 30, n odd.

Properties

The following facts, even the reciprocity laws, are straightforward deductions from the definition of the Jacobi symbol and the corresponding properties of the Legendre symbol.

The Jacobi symbol is defined only when the upper argument ("numerator") is an integer and the lower argument ("denominator") is a positive odd integer.

1. If n is (an odd) prime, then the Jacobi symbol  is equal to (and written the same as) the corresponding Legendre symbol.

2. If , then 

3. 

If either the top or bottom argument is fixed, the Jacobi symbol is a completely multiplicative function in the remaining argument:

4. 

5. 

The law of quadratic reciprocity: if m and n are odd positive coprime integers, then

6.  

and its supplements

7. , 

and 

8. 

Combining properties 4 and 8 gives:

9. 

Like the Legendre symbol:

If  = −1 then a is a quadratic nonresidue modulo n.

If a is a quadratic residue modulo n and gcd(a,n) = 1, then  = 1.

But, unlike the Legendre symbol:

If  = 1 then a may or may not be a quadratic residue modulo n.

This is because for a to be a quadratic residue modulo n, it has to be a quadratic residue modulo every prime factor of n. However, the Jacobi symbol equals one if, for example, a is a non-residue modulo exactly two of the prime factors of n. 

Although the Jacobi symbol cannot be uniformly interpreted in terms of squares and non-squares, it can be uniformly interpreted as the sign of a permutation by Zolotarev's lemma.

The Jacobi symbol  is a Dirichlet character to the modulus n.

Calculating the Jacobi symbol

The above formulas lead to an efficient  algorithm for calculating the Jacobi symbol, analogous to the Euclidean algorithm for finding the gcd of two numbers. (This should not be surprising in light of rule 2.)

 Reduce the "numerator" modulo the "denominator" using rule 2.
 Extract any even "numerator" using rule 9.
 If the "numerator" is 1, rules 3 and 4 give a result of 1. If the "numerator" and "denominator" are not coprime, rule 3 gives a result of 0.
 Otherwise, the "numerator" and "denominator" are now odd positive coprime integers, so we can flip the symbol using rule 6, then return to step 1.

Implementation in Lua
function jacobi(n, k)
  assert(k > 0 and k % 2 == 1)
  n = n % k
  t = 1
  while n ~= 0 do
    while n % 2 == 0 do
      n = n / 2
      r = k % 8
      if r == 3 or r == 5 then
        t = -t
      end
    end
    n, k = k, n
    if n % 4 == 3 and k % 4 == 3 then
      t = -t
    end
    n = n % k
  end
  if k == 1 then
    return t
  else
    return 0
  end
end

Implementation in C++ 
// a/n is represented as (a,n)
int jacobi(int a, int n) {
    assert(n > 0 && n%2 == 1);
    //step 1
    a = a % n;
    int t = 1;
    int r;
    //step 3
    while (a != 0) {
        //step 2
        while (a % 2 == 0) {
            a /= 2;
            r = n % 8;
            if (r == 3 || r == 5) {
                t = -t;
            }
        }
        //step 4
        r = n;
        n = a;
        a = r;
        if (a % 4 == 3 && n % 4 == 3) {
            t = -t;
        }
        a = a % n;
    }
    if (n == 1) {
        return t;
    }
    else {
        return 0;
    }
}

Example of calculations

The Legendre symbol  is only defined for odd primes p.

Problem: Given that 9907 is prime, calculate .

Using the Legendre symbol

Using the Jacobi symbol

The difference between the two calculations is that when the Legendre symbol is used the "numerator" has to be factored into prime powers before the symbol is flipped. This makes the  calculation using the Legendre symbol significantly slower than the one using the Jacobi symbol, as there is no known polynomial-time algorithm for factoring integers. In fact, this is why Jacobi introduced the symbol.

Primality testing

There is another way the Jacobi and Legendre symbols differ. If the Euler's criterion formula is used modulo a composite number, the result may or may not be the value of the Jacobi symbol, and in fact may not even be −1 or 1. For example,

So if it is unknown whether a number n is prime or composite, we can pick a random number a, calculate the Jacobi symbol  and compare it with Euler's formula; if they differ modulo n, then n is composite; if they have the same residue modulo n for many different values of a, then n is "probably prime".

This is the basis for the probabilistic Solovay–Strassen primality test and refinements such as the Baillie–PSW primality test and the Miller–Rabin primality test.

In nominal cases, the Jacobi symbol:

This also holds for the final residue  and hence can be used as a verification of probable validity.

See also

Kronecker symbol, a generalization of the Jacobi symbol to all integers.
Power residue symbol, a generalization of the Jacobi symbol to higher powers residues.

Notes

References

External links 
 Calculate Jacobi symbol shows the steps of the calculation.

Modular arithmetic